Khlebodarovka is a rural locality (a village) in Yazykovsky Selsoviet, Blagovarsky District, Bashkortostan, Russia. The population was 51 as of 2010. There is 1 street.

Geography 
Khlebodarovka is located 8 km north of Yazykovo (the district's administrative centre) by road. Starogornovo is the nearest rural locality.

References 

Rural localities in Blagovarsky District